Elwood Plummer is an American former basketball coach and player. He served as the head coach of the Prairie View A&M Panthers from 1973 to 1979, and 1990 to 2002.

Playing career
Plummer is a native of San Antonio, Texas, and attended Wheatley High School. He played on the school's basketball team and averaged 28 points per game as a senior. Plummer attended San Antonio College for two years and became one of the most prolific scorers in the junior college ranks. During his sophomore season, he led the Texas Junior College Athletic Association in scoring with 29.8 points per game and was named the league's most valuable player. Plummer transferred to play for the Jackson State Tigers and became one of the top guards in the Southwestern Athletic Conference (SWAC). He graduated from Jackson State University in 1966.

Coaching career
Plummer began his coaching career at St. Philip's College in San Antonio for two seasons, where he accumulated a 41–19 record. He returned to the Jackson State Tigers team in 1969 as an assistant coach to Paul Covington. Plummer was appointed as head coach of the Wiley College basketball team in 1972, where he amassed a 20–8 record and won the state tournament in his only season.

Plummer was named head coach of the Prairie View A&M Panthers on August 25, 1973, where he became the youngest head coach in the SWAC at the age of 28. He directed winning teams from 1973 to 1979. Plummer served as the head coach of the Huston–Tillotson University men's basketball team from 1979 to 1988. He was the associate athletic director of Huston–Tillotson from 1988 to 1990.

Plummer returned to Prairie View A&M in April 1990 but the university discontinued its basketball program one month later. It was reinstated in July 1990 but with few remaining players and no scholarship program. Prairie View A&M's limited recruitment abilities led to Plummer targeting players who had a high academic average that would qualify for an academic scholarship or those who were indigent that qualified for financial aid. The Panthers had an 0–28 record during the 1991–92 season that established an NCAA Division I record for most losses in a season. Plummer experienced his greatest success with the Panthers during the 1997–98 season as the team won its first SWAC tournament title and appeared in the 1998 NCAA Division I men's basketball tournament.

On March 10, 2002, Plummer and his coaching staff were dismissed by Prairie View A&M. His total record with the Panthers was 153–377. Plummer returned to Huston–Tillotson in 2010 as head coach until his departure in 2013.

Plummer was inducted into the Texas Black Sports Hall of Fame in 2006.

References

External links
College coaching record

Year of birth missing (living people)
Living people
African-American basketball coaches
African-American basketball players
American men's basketball coaches
American men's basketball players
Basketball coaches from Texas
Basketball players from San Antonio
Guards (basketball)
Jackson State Tigers basketball players
Junior college men's basketball players in the United States
Prairie View A&M Panthers basketball coaches
Sportspeople from San Antonio
21st-century African-American people